"Spooky, Scary Skeletons" is a Halloween song by American musician Andrew Gold, first released on his 1996 album Halloween Howls: Fun & Scary Music.

Since the 2010s, the song has received a resurgence in popularity online as an Internet meme. In 2019, Intelligencers Brian Feldman called the song "the Internet's Halloween anthem", and that same year, Rolling Stones E. J. Dickson referred to the song as the "Halloween meme" of Generation Z. In 2021, Alexandra Petri of The Washington Post ranked the song number two on her list of the 50 best Halloween songs of all time.

Background and recording
"Spooky, Scary Skeletons" was one of nine original songs on the album Halloween Howls, released, according to Gold on his 1996 liner notes, to fill a void of availability of fun and scary Halloween original songs. Andrew produced, mixed, sang and played all the instruments on the track.

Release and Internet popularity
In 2006, Disney included the song on their DVD Disney Sing Along Songs: Happy Haunting. They paired the song with the 1930s animated short film The Skeleton Dance by Ub Iwerks. In 2010, YouTube user TJ Ski remade the video from the Disney DVD, pairing the animated short with the song, after he was unable to find the original video online. TJ Ski's video has garnered over 31 million views since it was uploaded.

"Spooky, Scary Skeletons" has since become an Internet meme, with its origins in YouTube gaming culture. One example of an early viral video featuring the track is a video that features Minecraft dancing to the song. Since the 2010s, the song has become a standard in music playlists for Halloween parties, along with the 1962 song "Monster Mash".

In 2013, Israeli-American remix musician Yoav Landau, member of the YouTube band The Living Tombstone created an electronic dance-like remix of the song with a faster tempo than the original. Their upload of the remix to YouTube has garnered over 94 million views. Intelligencer Brian Feldman called the Living Tombstone's remix "probably the most well-known version of the song". This remix further propelled the song's status as an Internet meme; both the original song and the Living Tombstone remix are often paired with such visuals as The Skeleton Dance and a video of a man dancing while wearing a pumpkin head and a black unitard, the latter being from a mid-2000s broadcast on local Omaha, Nebraska news station KXVO.

In 2019, "Spooky, Scary Skeletons" and its The Living Tombstone remix experienced a resurgence of popularity on the short-form video and social media platform TikTok, where over 2.5 million videos featuring the song—including videos by such celebrities as Will Smith dancing to the track—have been posted. By 2022, there were over 5 million TikTok videos featuring the song.

In 2021, Craft Recording issued a first-ever vinyl record release of Halloween Howls, adding one of the more popular remixes of "Spooky, Scary Skeletons" to the tracklist. New cover art was created by Jess Rotter. Craft dedicated a web page to the song. NPR's Elizabeth Blair recommended the vinyl release for children. Official merchandise relating to the song, including hoodies and T-shirts, is also available at Craft Recording's official store.

Linda Ronstadt, Andrew Gold's former Bryndle bandmate Karla Bonoff, Stephen Bishop, and Nicolette Larson all joined in to do the "Monster Mash." In addition to that graveyard smash, the other guest Howl-ers include the late David Cassidy on "Halloween Party".

Gold's daughters, Emily and Victoria, were credited for background vocals.

Charts

Cover versions and use in media
In 2018, the American rock band Red Hot Chili Peppers performed a cover of the song at a live Halloween performance.

A cover of the song by LvCrft was used by Freeform to promote their "31 Nights of Halloween" programming block in both 2020 and in 2021.

Album releases
 1996: Halloween Howls 
 2019: Halloween Howls Deluxe Edition (Digital including remix bonus tracks)
 2021: Halloween Howls (Vinyl with remix bonus track)

Single releases
 2020: "DMA ILLAN REMIX"
 2021: "The Remixes" (including SharaZ remix)
 2022: "The Living Tombstone - Slowed & Reverb Remix

References

Andrew Gold songs
Halloween songs
Internet memes introduced in the 2010s